The 1937 Baltic Cup was the ninth playing of the Baltic Cup football tournament. It was held from September 3–7, 1937 in Kaunas, Lithuania.

As Latvia and Estonia finished with equal points and equal goal difference, a replay was organised for the first time which Latvia won 2–0.

Standings

Results

This match was also valid for the 1938 FIFA World Cup qualification.

Replay

Statistics

Goalscorers

See also
Balkan Cup
Nordic Football Championship

References

1937
1937–38 in European football
1937 in Lithuanian football
1937 in Latvian football
1937 in Estonian football
1937